The 1895–96 Chicago Maroons men's basketball team represented the University of Chicago in intercollegiate basketball during the 1895–96 season. The team finished the season with a 5–2 record and have the distinction of playing in the first five-on-five college basketball game played in United States history versus the Iowa Hawkeyes.  The team played their home games on campus in the Men's Gymnasium.

The team consisted of seven players; Allen T. Burns and George H. Garrey at guard; Henry D. Hubbard and Arthur J. Mullen at forward; with Earl W. Peabody, Edgar B. Van Osdel and Leon S. Alschuler as centers. The Maroons were coached by Horace Butterworth who would eventually become Northwestern's baseball coach and athletic director followed by becoming head football coach for Temple.

Five-on-five game

Roster

Source

Schedule
Source							

|-	

|- align="center" bgcolor=""

|- align="center" bgcolor=""

	

	

|- align="center" bgcolor=""

|-

References

External links
 

Chicago Maroons men's basketball seasons
Chicago Maroons Men's Basketball Team
Chicago Maroons Men's Basketball Team
Chicago